Saytajota (possibly from Aymara sayt'u tapering, quta lake "tapering lake") is a lake in the Andes of Peru. It is located in the Puno Region, Carabaya Province, Macusani District, at a place named Saytoccota. Saytajota is situated northwest of the lake Tocsajota and the mountain Vilajota and east of the lake Parinajota and another lake named Saytajota which lies next to Parinajota, north of it.

References

Lakes of Peru
Lakes of Puno Region